Sir Oliver Christopher Anderson Scott FRCR, MRCS, MB BChir, LRCP, 3rd Baronet Scott Of Yews (6 November 1922 – 4 November 2016) was a radiobiologist and philanthropist who worked with LH Gray and on Gray's death became the second director of the Gray Laboratory.

He became in line for the 3rd Baronet Scott on the death of his brother, James Philip Edmund Scott (born 13 August 1915, died in Libya 31 May 1942)

In 1991 the main building of the Cancer Research Campaign Gray Laboratory is named the Oliver Scott Building.

Education
Educated at Charterhouse School, Oliver read natural sciences at King's College Cambridge, joined the 
MRCS and MB BChir 1946 University of Cambridge, LRCP and qualified as a radiologist at St Thomas’s Hospital in 1946.

Career
 HMS Dolphin (1947 - 1949)
 Director of the Provincial Insurance Company (1955 - 1964)
 Director of Gray Lab (1965 - 1969),
 President of the oncology section of the Royal Society of Medicine (1987–88)

Research
Oliver Scott was best known for his research on the oxygen effect in radiotherapy.

Oliver Scott provided anonymous funding to the British Empire Cancer Campaign to establish a Radiobiological Research Laboratory with Hal Gray as the first director.

References

Directors of Gray Cancer Institute
Baronets in the Baronetage of the United Kingdom
1922 births
2016 deaths
People educated at Charterhouse School
Radiobiologists